Kim Christensen is the name of:

Kim Christensen (footballer, born 1979), Danish football goalkeeper
Kim Christensen (footballer, born 1980), Danish football striker
Kim Christensen (sailor), Danish sailor
Kim Christensen (shot putter), Danish shot putter
Kim Christensen (musician), Swedish drone ambient musician
Kim Christensen (journalist), U.S. journalist, two-time Pulitzer Prize winner

See also
Kim Kristensen